Comrades is a 1928 American silent drama film directed by Cliff Wheeler and starring Donald Keith, Helene Costello, and Gareth Hughes.

Cast
 Donald Keith as Perry O'Toole  
 Helene Costello as Helen Dixon  
 Gareth Hughes as Bob Dixon  
 Lucy Beaumont as Mrs. Dixon  
 Josef Swickard as John Burton  
 James Lloyd as Tommy

References

Bibliography
 Donald W. McCaffrey & Christopher P. Jacobs. Guide to the Silent Years of American Cinema. Greenwood Publishing, 1999.

External links

1928 films
1928 drama films
Silent American drama films
Films directed by Cliff Wheeler
American silent feature films
1920s English-language films
American black-and-white films
1920s American films